Togrenda is a village in the municipality of Ås, Norway. Its population (2005) is 2,588.

Ås, Akershus
Villages in Akershus